The 2013 EAFF East Asian Cup was the 5th edition of this regional competition, the football championship of East Asia.  Two preliminary competitions were held during 2012. Mongolia were suspended from the EAFF and could not compete in any EAFF competition until March 2014, whilst Australia accepted an invitation to take part.

Preliminary round 1
The first round of the Preliminary Competition was hosted by Guam between 18–22 July 2012.  The winner of the group advanced to the second round.

Times listed are UTC+10:00

Matches

Awards

Goals
4 goals

 Jason Cunliffe

3 goals

 Chan Kin Seng

1 goals

 Zachary DeVille
 Marcus Lopez
 Ho Man Hou
 Vernon
 Joe Wang Miller
 Kirk Schuler

Preliminary round 2
The second round of the preliminary competition was held in Hong Kong between 1 December and 9 December 2012. The winner of the group advanced to the final tournament.

Squads

Matches
Times listed are UTC+8

Awards

Goals
4 goals

 Archie Thompson
 Ri Myong-jun

3 goals

 Pak Nam-chol

2 goals

 Eli Babalj
 Aziz Behich
 Richard García
 Aaron Mooy
 Adam Taggart
 Chan Siu Ki
 An Il-bom
 Pak Song-chol

1 goal

 Robert Cornthwaite
 Brett Emerton
 Michael Marrone
 Mark Milligan
 Chen Hao-wei
 Lo Chih-an
 Elias Merfalen
 Dylan Naputi
 Chan Wai Ho
 Lee Hong Lim
 An Yong-hak
 Jong Il-gwan
 Pak Nam-chol
 Ri Kwang-hyok
 Ryang Yong-gi

1 own goal

 Yang Chao-hsun

Final tournament

Squads

Matches
The final stage of the tournament was played in South Korea between 20 and 28 July 2013.

Times listed are UTC+9

Awards

Goals

3 goals

 Yoichiro Kakitani

2 goals

 Mitchell Duke
 Sun Ke
 Wang Yongpo
 Yuya Osako

1 goal

 Adam Taggart
 Tomi Jurić
 Aaron Mooy
 Wu Lei
 Yang Xu
 Yu Dabao
 Manabu Saito
 Masato Kudo
 Yuzo Kurihara
 Yun Il-lok

Final standings

Broadcasting

Controversies
At the final match between South Korea and Japan on 28 July, South Korean fans booed the start of the Japanese anthem and later upped the political sloganeering with a banner that covered most of the width of one end of the ground that read, in Korean, "The nation that forgets history has no future."(), apparently aiming at the Japanese leaders' reluctance to admit to wrongdoings during its militaristic and colonial past, after they displayed huge pictures of Ahn Jung-geun, who assassinated the first Prime Minister of Japan and then-Japanese Resident-General of Korea Itō Hirobumi back in 1909, and Yi Sun-sin, a Korean naval commander who is famed for his victories against the Japanese navy during the Imjin war in the Joseon Dynasty back in the 16th century. The banner was not removed until Korea Football Association (KFA) directed supporters to do so after the first half of the match. After the banner was taken down, "Red Devils," a group of South Korean football supporters, refused to cheer on the national team in the second half. On its Facebook page, the Seoul sector of the Red Devils wrote that its members would not bang drums or chant songs for South Korea in protest of the decision by the KFA to remove the banner.

Kuniya Daini, President of Japan Football Association, said "We ask the East Asian Football Federation to thoroughly investigate the matter and act in the appropriate fashion," and Japanese Chief Cabinet Secretary Yoshihide Suga said the incident was "extremely regrettable" and the Japanese government "will respond appropriately based on FIFA rules when the facts are revealed.", while KFA said "We are still investigating the matter. We have no official statement now".

Japanese Sports Minister Hakubun Shimomura went further on Tuesday, saying the style of the banners called into question "the nature of the people" in South Korea.

The South Korean Ministry of Foreign Affairs then responded with a statement deploring Shimomura's "rude comments".

On 31 July, KFA issued a statement insisting that Japanese fans waving a large "rising sun" Japanese military flag had incited South Korean supporters. 

Australia commitment to the ASEAN Football Federation is questioned due to its participation in this tournament while having not participated in a single edition of the AFF Championship, the top level competition in the sub-confederation Australia which later became a member of in 2013.

References

External links
 EAFF East Asian Cup 2013 – Preliminary Round 1 at EAFF.com
 EAFF East Asian Cup 2013 – Preliminary Round 2 at EAFF.com

EAFF E-1 Football Championship
East
East
2013
EAFF